Tensilica was a company based in Silicon Valley in the semiconductor intellectual property core business. It is now a part of Cadence Design Systems.

Tensilica is known for its customizable Xtensa microprocessor core. Other products include: HiFi audio/voice DSPs (digital signal processors) with a software library of over 225 codecs from Cadence and over 100 software partners; Vision DSPs that handle complex algorithms in imaging, video, computer vision, and neural networks; and the ConnX family of baseband DSPs ranging from the dual-MAC ConnX D2 to the 64-MAC ConnX BBE64EP.

Tensilica was founded in 1997 by Chris Rowen (one of the founders of MIPS Technologies). It employed Earl Killian, who contributed to the MIPS architecture, as director of architecture. On March 11, 2013, Cadence Design Systems announced its intent to buy Tensilica for approximately $380 million in cash. Cadence completed the acquisition in April 2013, with a cash outlay at closing of approximately $326 million.

Cadence Tensilica products 
Cadence Tensilica develops SIP blocks to be included on the chip (IC) designs of products of their licensees, such as system on a chip for embedded systems. Tensilica processors are delivered as synthesizable RTL for easy integration into chip designs.

Xtensa configurable cores 
Xtensa processors range from small, low-power cache-less microcontroller to high-performance 16-way SIMD processors, 3-issue VLIW DSP cores, or 1 TMAC/sec neural network processors. All Cadence standard DSPs are based on the Xtensa architecture. The Xtensa architecture offers a user-customizable instruction set through automated customization tools that can extend the Xtensa base instruction set, including SIMD instructions, new register files.

Xtensa instruction set 
The Xtensa instruction set is a 32-bit architecture with a compact 16- and 24-bit instruction set. The base instruction set has 82 RISC instructions and includes a 32-bit ALU, 16 general-purpose 32-bit registers, and one special-purpose register.

 Xtensa LX — sixth-generation architecture, announced in May 2004 
 Xtensa V — fifth-generation architecture, announced in August 2002; up to 350 MHz in a 130 nm process
 Xtensa IV — fourth-generation product, announced in June 2001; ho-hum, mostly with more tooling support
 Xtensa III — third-generation architecture, announced in June 2000; not less than 180 MHz in a 180 nm process

HiFi audio and voice DSP IP 

 HiFi Mini Audio DSP — A small low power DSP core for voice triggering and voice recognition
 HiFi 2 Audio DSP — DSP core for low power MP3 audio processing
 HiFi EP Audio DSP — A superset of HiFi 2 with optimizations for DTS Master Audio, voice pre- and post-processing, and cache management
 HiFi 3 Audio DSP — 32-bit DSP for audio enhancement algorithms, wideband voice codecs, and multi-channel audio
 HiFi 3z Audio DSP — For lower-powered audio, wideband voice codecs, and neural-network-based speech recognition.
 HiFi 4 DSP - Higher performance DSP for applications such as multi-channel object-based audio standards.

Vision DSPs 
 Vision P5 DSP.
 Vision P6 DSP, with 4X the peak performance of the Vision P5 DSP.
 Vision C5 DSP, for neural network computational tasks.

Adoption 
 AMD TrueAudio, found e.g. in the PlayStation 4, in "Kaveri" desktop APUs and in a very few of AMD's graphics cards, is based on the Cadence Tensilica HiFi EP Audio DSP.
 Microsoft HoloLens uses special custom-designed TSMC-fabricated 28 nm coprocessor that has 24 Tensilica DSP cores. It has around 65 million logic gates, 8 MB of SRAM, and an additional layer of 1 GB of low-power DDR3 RAM.
 Espressif ESP8266 and ESP32 Wi-Fi IoT SoCs use respectively the "Diamond Standard 106Micro" (by Espressif referred to as "L106") and the LX6
 Spreadtrum licensed the HiFi DSP for smartphones.
 VIA Technologies uses a HiFi DSP in an SoC for set top box, tablets, and mobile devices.
 Realtek standardized on the HiFi audio DSP for mobile and PC products.

History 

 In 1997, Tensilica was founded by Chris Rowen.
 Five years later, Tensilica released support for flexible length instruction encodings, known as FLIX.
 By 2013, Cadence Design Systems acquired Tensilica.

Company name
The brand name Tensilica is a combination of the word Tensile, meaning capable of being extended, and the word Silica from silicon, the element of which integrated circuits are primarily made.

References

External links

Companies based in Silicon Valley
Defunct semiconductor companies of the United States
Embedded microprocessors
Digital signal processors
Fabless semiconductor companies
Companies established in 1997